Rene Lizarraga Valenzuela (born March 21, 1993, in Mexico city, Mexico) is a Mexican taekwondo practitioner who won a silver medal at the 2013 World Taekwondo Championships. He was ranked 5th at the 2017 World Taekwondo Championships.

References

Living people
1993 births
Mexican male taekwondo practitioners
Taekwondo practitioners at the 2019 Pan American Games
Taekwondo practitioners at the 2015 Pan American Games
Pan American Games bronze medalists for Mexico
Pan American Games medalists in taekwondo
Medalists at the 2015 Pan American Games
Sportspeople from Mexico City
21st-century Mexican people